Frankie Jones (12 February 1933 – 1991) born in Plean was a Scottish professional fly/bantamweight boxer of the 1950s and '60s, who won the British Boxing Board of Control (BBBofC) Scottish Area flyweight title, BBBofC British flyweight title, and British Empire flyweight title, his professional fighting weight varied from , i.e. flyweight to , i.e. bantamweight.

Genealogical information
Frankie Jones had two daughters Jean and Isabel and twin boys Alan and Stewart. He also had a grandson Clifford, and granddaughter Carly, and two great grandchildren Dillon and Leah, the children of Clifford.

References

External links

Image - Frankie Jones

1933 births
Bantamweight boxers
Flyweight boxers
Scottish male boxers
Sportspeople from Stirling (council area)
1991 deaths